DAST may refer to:

 Diethylaminosulfur trifluoride, an organosulfur compound
 Draw-a-Scientist Test, designed to investigate children's perceptions of the scientist
 Dynamic application security testing, in computing
 Mir Dast (1874–1945), an Indian Muslim soldier